"Do I Have to Say the Words?" is a song by Canadian singer and songwriter Bryan Adams for his sixth studio album, Waking Up the Neighbours (1991). It was written and produced by Adams and Robert John "Mutt" Lange, with Jim Vallance serving as co-writer of the track. It was released in July 1992 as the sixth single from the album. "Do I Have to Say the Words?" is a mid-tempo pop rock ballad with guitar riffs and soft synths in its instrumentation, while Adams gives a dramatic vocal delivery.

The song received generally positive reviews from music critics, who praised the track for being a beautiful ballad and Adams for his vocal delivery. Commercially, the song was successful in North America, reaching number two in Canada and number eleven on the US Billboard Hot 100. Elsewhere, it peaked modestly, reaching the top-forty in three other countries. The accompanying music video for the song was directed by Anton Corbijn and was shot in Turkey and Iceland. The song was also included on some of Adams' compilations.

Composition and reception
"Do I Have to Say the Words?" was written and produced by Bryan Adams and Robert John "Mutt" Lange, with Jim Vallance serving as a co-writer. The track began life as a different Adams/Vallance composition called "Rescue Me", an unreleased version of which was recorded with producer Steve Lillywhite. "Rescue Me" was a mid-tempo song that Jim Vallance has described as "U2 inspired". As part of the recording sessions for Waking Up the Neighbours, Mutt Lange radically altered the song, switching the chorus to become the verse, slowing the tempo to create a rock ballad and adding a new chorus, to create the new track "Do I Have to Say the Words?". According to the sheet music published at Musicnotes.com by Universal Music Publishing Group, it is written in the key of G major with a rock ballad tempo of 72 beats per minute in common time. The mid-tempo ballad features guitar riffs and "cushiony" synths as its instrumentation, while Adams delivers a dramatic vocal. In a part of the chorus, he "whines", "Do I have to tell the truth?"

Larry Flick of Billboard called it a "charming rock ballad", where Adams "returns to the pensive, romantic tone of his record-breaking hit '(Everything I Do) I Do It for You'." Flick noted that the singer "excels at laying agile [instrumentation] for his gravelly, dramatic vocal delivery." David Hiltbrand and Craig Tomashoff of People named it the best of the ballads on the album. James Hunter of Rolling Stone named it a moodier "eloquent mall ballad," while Jan DeKnock of Chicago Tribune noted that "he really does shine brightest on [the] beautifully bittersweet [ballad]."

Music video
The music video was directed by Anton Corbijn and was mainly shot in Istanbul, Turkey on July 28, 1992. The video marked the first outdoor stadium show in Istanbul history, with over 20,000 concertgoers in İnönü Stadium. Part of the video was filmed in Iceland with the female character.

Track listings

US cassette single
 "Do I Have to Say the Words?" (edit) – 4:18
 "Cuts Like a Knife" (live) – 5:36

 UK and European 7-inch single
 "Do I Have to Say the Words?" (edit)
 "Summer of '69" (live)

 UK and European CD single
 "Do I Have To Say The Words?"
 "Summer of '69" (live)
 "Kids Wanna Rock" (live)
 "Can't Stop This Thing We Started" (live)

Charts

Weekly charts

Year-end charts

Release history

References

External links
 

1990s ballads
1991 songs
1992 singles
A&M Records singles
Black-and-white music videos
Bryan Adams songs
Music videos directed by Anton Corbijn
Rock ballads
Song recordings produced by Robert John "Mutt" Lange
Songs written by Bryan Adams
Songs written by Jim Vallance
Songs written by Robert John "Mutt" Lange